Luke Mogelson is an American journalist. He has contributed to The New Yorker and New York Times Magazine, covering the wars in Afghanistan, Syria, and Iraq, as well as Minneapolis after the murder of George Floyd and the January 6th attack on the Capitol.

Biography 
Mogelson was born in St. Louis. He graduated from Bennington College in 2005. He was a contributing writer for the New York Times Magazine, reporting from Kabul, Afghanistan, from 2011 to 2014. He then moved to The New Yorker in 2013, where he has reported from Syria and on domestic affairs in the United States.

Achievements and honors 
Mogelson won a Livingston Award in 2013, a National Magazine Award in 2014, and his work has been supported by the Pulitzer Center on Crisis Reporting. In 2021, he received a George Polk Award for his coverage of protests and racial politics in the United States.

Works
Mogelson is the author of The Storm is Here: An American Crucible and These Heroic, Happy Dead, a book of short stories.

The Storm is Here: An American Crucible 
Mogelson's first book, The Storm is Here: An American Crucible, was published September 13, 2022, by Penguin Random House. The book describes the social discord in the United States through a series of eye-witness accounts following the distress created by COVID-19, economic uncertainty, and the clash of political and race relations within the US post 2016.

Bibliography 

 The Storm is Here: An American Crucible, Penguin Random House, September 13, 2022.

References 

American male journalists
Living people
Year of birth missing (living people)
The New Yorker people
21st-century American journalists
Bennington College alumni